The 1990 AFC U-16 Championship, was the fourth iteration of the AFC U-16 Championship, a tournament organised by the Asian Football Confederation (AFC) and held every two years for Asian under-16 teams.

United Arab Emirates was the host nation. The tournament was played out in Dubai, Sharjah, and Abu Dhabi.

Qualification

Qualified teams
 (host)
 (Group 1 winner)
 (Group 2 winner)
 (Group 3 winner)
 (Group 4 winner)
 (Group 5 winner)
 (Group 6 winner)
 (Group 7 winner)

Group stage

Group A

Group B

The then-reigning U-16 world champions Saudi Arabia withdrew, citing Blue Diamond Affair.

Knockout stage

Semifinals

Third-place match

Final

Winners

Teams qualified for 1991 FIFA U-17 World Championship

Sources
rsssf.com

Under
International association football competitions hosted by the United Arab Emirates
1989–90 in Emirati football
1990 in youth association football
AFC U-16 Championships